Bakhmaro is a village and mountain resort in the Chokhatauri Municipality of Guria in western Georgia. It lies on the Bakhvistsqali river.

References
Georgian Soviet Encyclopedia Vol. 2, p. 255, 1977.

External links

Cities and towns in Guria
Geography of Georgia (country)